The Wild Ones of San Gil Bridge (Spanish:Las salvajes en Puente San Gil) is a 1966 Spanish comedy film directed by Antoni Ribas and starring Adolfo Marsillach, Elena María Tejeiro and María Silva.

Cast
 Adolfo Marsillach
 Elena María Tejeiro
 María Silva 
 Nuria Torray 
 Luis Marín
 Rosanna Yanni
 Jesús Aristu 
 Trini Alonso
 Carmen de Lirio 
 Vicky Lagos 
 Valentín Tornos 
 Charo Soriano 
 Marisa Paredes 
 Luisa Sala

References

Bibliography 
 Peter Cowie & Derek Elley. World Filmography: 1967. Fairleigh Dickinson University Press, 1977.

External links 
 

1966 comedy films
Spanish comedy films
1966 films
1960s Spanish-language films
Films directed by Antoni Ribas
Films scored by Carmelo Bernaola
1960s Spanish films